Juan Lebrero is a paralympic athlete from Spain competing mainly in category F41 throwing events.

Juan competed in both the 1992 and 1996 Summer Paralympics as part of the Spanish Paralympic athletics team.  In both years he competed in all three throws, in 1992 he failed to get a valid throw in the discus, finished fourteenth in the javelin and ninth in the shot put.  In 1996 he finished fifth in the discus, ninth in the javelin and won a bronze medal in the shot put.

References

External links
 

Paralympic athletes of Spain
Athletes (track and field) at the 1992 Summer Paralympics
Athletes (track and field) at the 1996 Summer Paralympics
Paralympic bronze medalists for Spain
Living people
Medalists at the 1996 Summer Paralympics
Year of birth missing (living people)
Paralympic medalists in athletics (track and field)
Spanish male discus throwers
Spanish male javelin throwers
Spanish male shot putters
Discus throwers with limb difference
Javelin throwers with limb difference
Shot putters with limb difference
Paralympic discus throwers
Paralympic javelin throwers
Paralympic shot putters